Malacrianza, also known as The Crow's Nest, is a Salvadoran/Canadian film written and directed by Arturo Menéndez. The film tells the story of a lowly piñata vendor from a small town in El Salvador and the struggles that befall him after an extortion letter is left on his doorstep.

Malacrianza is the first fiction film from El Salvador since 1969 which has also had the first worldwide release. The film was released on October 4, 2014 at the AFI Silver Latin American Film Festival.

Plot

Don Cleo is a humble piñata vendor from a small town in El Salvador who receives an extortion letter at his doorstep. The letter instructs him to deliver $500 in 72 hours or he will be killed. The amount seems near impossible for the seemingly destitute Don Cleo, as he navigates through his reality, neighborhood, relationships and the few aspirations he still has. 
 
Don Cleo exhausts every opportunity to raise the money, gathering as much as possible from friends and acquaintances. Yet, as much as he tries, Don Cleo finds himself in more trouble than when he started. With no other hope to survive, Don Cleo decides to face his fears and stands up to his transgressors.

Production
The film was shot on location in El Salvador. Many scenes from the film were shot in gangster-dominated areas, and reflect the violence that the director saw in his own life. The script was based on a collection of real stories collected by Arturo Menéndez.

Cast
 Salvador Solis – Don Cleo
 Karla Valencia – Araceli
 Demetrio Aguilar 
 Rodrigo Calderon
 Gerardo Chinchilla 
 Emis Cruz 
 Herbert de Paz
 Mercy Flores
 Guillermo Menendez
 Brenda Samour
 Marcela Santamaria
 Leandro Sánchez
 Milton Torres
 Hector Vides
 Giancarlo Villeda

References

External links
 

2014 films